İsmail Ege Şaşmaz  (born 25 November 1993) is a Turkish actor.

Career 
He had his first acting experience in Manisa Municipality Inter-high School Theater Competition with a role in the play titled Acil Servis. He graduated from Polinas Anatolian and Industrial Vocational High School and finished his education at Manisa Municipality Conservatory. 

Şaşmaz started his career with role in the popular series Güneşi Beklerken. He then continued his career by appearing in commercial films of some brands. Şaşmaz later joined the cast of Serçe Sarayı and had a leading role in the Günebakan as Rüzgar and youth series Lise Devriyesi. 

After playing the role of Serdar in the TV series Aşk Yalanı Sever, he rose to prominence in 2018 by portraying the character of Mehmet in the historical series Mehmetçik Kut'ül Amare. Between 2020 and 2021, he portrayed the role of Faysal in the historical series Uyanış: Büyük Selçuklu, a spy sent by Hassan-i Sabbah. He recently played the role of "Harun Karasu" in the drama series El Kızı. He portrayed the Anatolian rock star Barış Akarsu in the film Barış Akarsu "Merhaba".

Filmography

References

External links 
 
 

1993 births
Living people
Turkish male television actors
Turkish male film actors
21st-century Turkish male actors